The Stepan Bandera monument in Lviv is a statue dedicated to Stepan Bandera, a controversial twentieth century Ukrainian politician, a fascist Nazi collaborator, and leader of the Banderite faction of the Organization of Ukrainian Nationalists (OUN-B). 

Bandera's OUN-B declared an independent Ukrainian state on 30 June 1941 in Lviv, which had just come under the control of Nazi Germany in the early stages of the Axis invasion of the Soviet Union. It pledged to work closely with Germany, which was presented as freeing Ukrainians from Soviet oppression, and OUN members subsequently took part in the Lviv pogroms.

Lviv is one of the main cities of Western Ukraine. The figure of Stepan Bandera stands in front of the Stele of Ukrainian Statehood. The monument was unveiled in 2007.

Description 
The monument is a larger than life statue of Stepan Bandera standing 7 meters tall. Behind it is the Stele of Ukrainian Statehood - a 30 meter tall triumphal arch with 4 columns, each column symbolizing a different period of the Ukrainian statehood. The first one - Kievan Rus', the second - the Cossack Hetmanate, the third - the Ukrainian People's Republic, and the fourth - the modern, independent Ukraine.

See also 

 Monuments to Stepan Bandera
 
 
 
 
 
 Stepan Bandera monument in Lviv
 
 
 
 
 
 
 
 
 Memorial for the victims killed by OUN-UPA (Luhansk)
 The Shot in the Back

References 

2007 establishments in Ukraine
Statues in Ukraine
Ukrainian Insurgent Army